Les Sybelles is a French linked ski area, located in the Savoie department in the Alps. It is one of the largest skiable domains in France. The resort was the home base of Jean-Pierre Vidal, winner of the gold medal in slalom at the 2002 Winter Olympics in Salt Lake City. 

The La Toussuire ski station is also used regularly as the finish of cycle races including the Tour de France and the Critérium du Dauphiné.

Slopes 
20 green slopes
40 blue slopes
31 red slopes
5 black slopes
  slopes total
2 snowparks

Villages 

The following villages are part of the ski resort of Les Sybelles:
 Les Albiez
 Le Corbier 
 St Jean d'Arves 
 La Toussuire
 Les Bottières
 St Sorlin d'Arves 
 St Colomban des Villards

References

External links 

 

Tourism in Auvergne-Rhône-Alpes
Ski areas and resorts in France
Tourist attractions in Savoie